The  was a class of electric multiple unit (EMU) railroad cars formerly used by the Japanese National Railways (JNR). These are EMU power cars of  length with a driver's cab at each end, three passenger doors on each side, and lengthwise bench-type passenger seating. The cars themselves were built in the later 1920s and 1930s for JNR's predecessor, the Japanese Government Railways (JGR), but the class, originally named , was established on 1 June 1953 by a JNR revision of its rolling stock classification regulations. In June 1959, a new JNR classification revision assigned the code  to all cab-equipped power cars, giving the KuMoHa 12 class its present name.

When the MoHa 12 class was formed in 1953, it consisted of 13 cars of the old JGR dual-cab  class. Over time, additional cars were added by remodeling related old JGR classes, for an eventual total of 33 cars.

List of cars
The various KuMoHa 12 cars have the following origins:
 12000–12003 - Built in 1933 as dual-cab MoHa 34 cars.
 12010–12018 - Built in 1929-1930 as single-cab  cars, then remodeled in 1950–1951 with dual cabs as MoHa 34 cars.
 12019–12027 - Built in 1929-1931 as single-cab MoHa 31 cars and reclassified in 1953 as  series 200. Remodeled in 1958 as dual-cab MoHa 12 cars.
 12030–12032 - Built in 1939-1941 as single-cab  cars and reclassified in 1953 as MoHa 11 series 400. Remodeled in 1958 as dual-cab MoHa 12 cars.
 12040 - Built in 1926 as a single-cab  car and reclassified in 1953 as a MoHa 11 series 100. Remodeled in 1960 as a dual-cab KuMoHa 12 car.
 12041 -  Built in 1927 as a single-cab MoHa 30, remodeled in 1953 as a cabless , and remodeled again in 1964 as  tractor car 22112. Converted in 1987 to a KuMoHa 12 for special-event passenger service by JR Central on the Iida Line. This car has been exhibited at the SCMaglev and Railway Park since March 2011.
 12050–12055 - Built in 1929-1931 as single-cab MoHa 31 cars and reclassified in 1953 as MoHa 11 series 200. Remodeled in 1959 as dual-cab KuMoHa 12 cars. Later operated by JR East on the Tsurumi Line ( Branch Line). The last car was withdrawn in 1996.

References

Electric multiple units of Japan
East Japan Railway Company
Central Japan Railway Company
Train-related introductions in 1933
1933 in rail transport
1500 V DC multiple units of Japan